The 2008 McDonald's All-American Girls Game was an All-star basketball game played on Wednesday, March 26, 2008 at the Bradley Center in Milwaukee, Wisconsin, home of the NBA’s Milwaukee Bucks. The game's rosters featured the best and most highly recruited high school girls graduating in 2008.  The game was the 7th annual version of the McDonald's All-American Game first played in 2002.

The 48 players were selected from 2,500 nominees by a committee of basketball experts. They were chosen not only for their on-court skills, but for their performances off the court as well. Coach Morgan Wootten, who had more than 1,200 wins as head basketball coach at DeMatha High School, was chairman of the selection committee. Legendary UCLA coach John Wooden, who has been involved in the McDonald's All American Games since its inception, served as chairman of the Games and as an advisor to the selection committee.

Proceeds from the 2008 McDonald's All American High School Basketball Games went to a local Ronald McDonald House Charities (RMHC) and its Ronald McDonald House program.

2008 Game
The game was telecast live by ESPN.  The All American Girls got the action started on a cold night in Milwaukee. The Bradley Center crowd seemed poised to watch an East Team, filled with an array of big name talent, dominate a smaller, lesser-known West Team. However, it was the West Team’s shooting and team play that prevailed in the 80-64 victory and a commanding 5-2 series lead.

Brooklyn Pope (Rutgers) led a balanced attack for the West Team, as she tallied a team high 13 points. Teammates Tiffany Hayes (Connecticut), Nikki Speed (Rutgers) and Nnemkadi Ogwumike (Stanford) added 9 points each. Ashley Gayle (Texas) showcased her jumping ability, as she swatted an incredible six shots, which places her second all-time.

The East Squad’s offensive attack was headed by Shekinna Stricklen (Tennessee) with a game high 17 points. The 2008 Morgan Wootten Player of the Year, Elena Delle Donne, contributed a double-double, as she netted 10 points and grabbed 11 rebounds. That rebound total places her in a tie for fifth place overall.

The 2008 John R. Wooden MVP Award went to co-recipients Nikki Speed and Brooklyn Pope, while LaSondra Barrett (LSU) took home the Naismith Award for Sportsmanship during the week’s events.

2008 East Roster

2008 West Roster

Coaches
The East team was coached by:
 Head Coach Sherri Retif of Germantown Academy (Fort Washington, Pennsylvania)
 Asst Coach Corry Irvin of Whitney Young High School (Chicago, Illinois)
 Asst Coach Caryn Jarocki of Highlands Ranch High School (Highlands Ranch, Colorado)

The West team was coached by:
 Head Coach Tom Klawitter of Parker High School (Janesville, Wisconsin)
 Asst Coach Heidi Bunek-Hamilton of Arrowhead High School (Hartland, Wisconsin)
 Asst Coach Jane Dooley of Parker High School (Janesville, Wisconsin)

Boxscore

Visitors: East

Home: West 

(* = Starting Line-up)

All-American Week

Schedule 
 Tuesday, March 25: Powerade JamFest
 Three-Point Shoot-out
 Timed Basketball Skills Competition
 Wednesday, March 26: 7th Annual Girls All-American Game

The Powerade JamFest is a skills-competition evening featuring basketball players who demonstrate their skills in two crowd-entertaining ways.  Since the first All-American game in 2002, players have competed in a 3-point shooting challenge and a timed basketball skills competition.

Contest Winners 
 The 2008 Timed Skills contest was won by Nneka Ogwumike.
 Ashley Corral was winner of the 2008 3-point shoot-out.

See also
 2008 McDonald's All-American Boys Game

References

External links
McDonald's All-American on the web

2008 in American women's basketball
2008